Cariboo Hill Secondary is a public high school in Burnaby, British Columbia, and part of School District 41 Burnaby. It is the smallest high school in Burnaby

References

High schools in Burnaby
Educational institutions in Canada with year of establishment missing